Santiago de Cuba is the second-largest city in Cuba and the capital city of Santiago de Cuba Province.

Historically Santiago de Cuba was the second-most important city on the island after Havana, and remains the second-largest. It is on a bay connected to the Caribbean Sea and an important sea port. In the 2012 population census, the city of Santiago de Cuba recorded a population of 431,272 people.

History 

Santiago de Cuba was the fifth village founded by Spanish conquistador Diego Velázquez de Cuéllar on July 25, 1515. The settlement was destroyed by fire in 1516, and was immediately rebuilt. This was the starting point of the expeditions led by Juan de Grijalba and Hernán Cortés to the coasts of Mexico in 1518, and in 1538 by Hernando de Soto's expedition to Florida. The first cathedral was built in the city in 1528. From 1522 until 1589, Santiago was the capital of the Spanish colony of Cuba.

The city was plundered by French forces in 1553, and by English forces in 1603. More than 50 years later the English raided again in 1662 under Christopher Myngs.

The city had a huge influx of French and British immigrants in the late 18th and early 19th centuries. Some eighteen thousand Saint Dominican refugees, both ethnic French whites and free people of color, and African freedmen, came from Saint-Domingue in the summer of 1803 during the last days of the Haitian slave revolt, which had started in 1791. Other refugees had emigrated from Saint-Domingue earlier in the revolution. Haiti declared its independence as a republic in 1804.

The French were withdrawing surviving troops after suffering heavy losses from warfare and yellow fever. The immigrants, who included freedmen as France had abolished slavery on Saint-Domingue,  struggled to maintain their freedom in Cuba, which was still a slave society. Cuba initially allowed only white refugees, women of color, children, and loyal "domestics" to land; French troops and all men of color over the age of thirteen were held off shore, to be rapidly deported to the mainland, as they were considered a revolutionary threat. Some French soldiers joined other refugees in Charleston, South Carolina, or New York City; others went to New Orleans.

The refugees who stayed added to the city's eclectic cultural mix, already rich with Spanish and African culture. Some of the women and children were impressed into slavery again, although they had been free. In 1809, after Napoleon Bonaparte's forces invaded Spain, French citizens were ordered out of Cuba. Most went to the United States, and thousands settled in New Orleans, with the freedmen increasing its African culture, as most had been born in Africa. The ethnic French whites and free people of color, generally with longer ties to French culture, added their flavor to the culture of the city as well.

Near the end of the century, during the Spanish–American War, Santiago was the site of the major defeat of Spanish troops at San Juan Hill on July 1, 1898. After capturing the surrounding hills, United States General William Rufus Shafter laid siege to the city. Spain later surrendered to the United States after Admiral William T. Sampson destroyed the Spanish Atlantic fleet just outside Santiago's harbor on July 3, 1898. Cuba had declared independence from Spain but was occupied by US troops for several years. Historians suggest they were there to ensure the sugar economy continued to be productive.

José Martí, a Cuban poet, writer, and national hero, is buried in Santa Ifigenia Cemetery in this city.

Role in the Cuban Revolution 
Santiago was the home of the 20th-century revolutionary hero Frank País. On July 26, 1953, the Cuban Revolution began with an ill-prepared armed attack on the Moncada Barracks by a small contingent of rebels led by Fidel Castro. Shortly after this disastrous incident, País began talking with students and young working people informally, drawing around him what became an extremely effective urban revolutionary alliance. He and his followers developed highly organized cells, coordinating a large-scale urban resistance that became instrumental in the success of the Cuban Revolution.

País' group prepared carefully, accruing weapons, collecting money, collecting medical supplies. They published a cheap newsletter that reported news critical of the government, attempting to counter Batista's censorship of the mainline press.

In the summer of 1955, País's organization merged with Castro's July 26 Movement. País became the leader of the new organization in Oriente province. Two years later he was betrayed to the police and was fatally shot after his capture.

On January 1, 1959, Fidel Castro proclaimed the victory of the Cuban Revolution from a balcony on Santiago de Cuba's city hall. The ashes of País were interred in Santa Ifigenia Cemetery, where Marti had been buried.

Culture 

Santiago de Cuba was the hometown of poet José María Heredia. The Teatro Heredia, which hosts theater and cultural events, is named in his honor. The mural relief portrait on the building façade depicts Juan Almeida Bosque, a commander of insurgent forces in the Cuban Revolution.

It is the birthplace of the world-famous Bacardi brand, which was started by Facundo Bacardi Masso in 1862. It now houses a museum that displays the extensive art collection of the Bacardí family.

Santiago de Cuba is well known for its cultural life. Some of Cuba's most famous musicians, including Compay Segundo, Ibrahim Ferrer and Eliades Ochoa (all of whom participated in the film Buena Vista Social Club) and trova composer Ñico Saquito (Benito Antonio Fernández Ortiz) were born in the city or in one of the villages surrounding it. They have contributed to the typical, country-like music of the city.

Santiago de Cuba is well known for its traditional music, most notably son, from which salsa has been derived. The city celebrates Carnival in July, although it typically precedes Lent. With the city preoccupied with the holiday, Castro chose July 26 to enter undetected into the city to assault the Moncada Barracks. During Carnival, traditional conga music is played in the streets on a traditional pentatonic trumpet, called the trompeta china.

A relatively high number of residents of the city adhere to Afro-Cuban religions, most notably santería. The city hosts an important community of descendants of immigrants from the early 19th century from what is now Haiti. Some aspects of the religious "vodún" heritage of the city can be traced back to this community.

The city features several historic architectural styles, from Baroque to neoclassical. Many colonial buildings have huge windows and balconies, where people can enjoy views of the steep streets and wooded hills. Preserved historical treasures include the first Spanish dwelling in the Americas, the first cathedral in Cuba, Cobre mine, the first copper mine opened in the Americas; and the first Cuban museum.

World Heritage Site 
The local citadel of San Pedro de la Roca is inscribed on the UNESCO World Heritage List as "the most complete, best-preserved example of Spanish-American military architecture, based on Italian and Renaissance design principles".

World Heritage Biosphere Reserve 
The Baconao Park was inscribed on the UNESCO World Heritage Biosphere Reserve List in 1987.

Geography 
Historically Santiago de Cuba has been the second-largest city in Cuba, behind Havana. It features a bay connected to the Caribbean Sea and is a major port. The municipality of Santiago de Cuba, its capital city, is the most populated municipality of Cuba.

The city has developed at the foot of the bay and is surrounded on land by the Sierra Maestra. It has a hot and humid climate. The landscapes includes the complexity of urban elements, and natural greenery and marine settings, all at the same time. It has an irregular offset to the bay, which contributed to the development of an urban setting where the avenues and streets are steep or descend.

Climate 
Under the Köppen climate classification, Santiago de Cuba has a tropical savanna climate with no significant wet and dry periods through the year.

Demographics 

In the 2012 population census the city of Santiago de Cuba recorded a population of 431,272 people.

Transportation 

Santiago is served by Antonio Maceo Airport. Cubana de Aviación connects the city with Havana, Port Au Prince, and Santo Domingo, with other airlines connecting to other cities in the Caribbean and North America.

The public transport in the city, as in Havana, is carried out by two divisions, Omnibus Metropolitanos (OM) and Metrobus.

Ferrocarriles de Cuba railways and ASTRO inter-city buses connect the city with Havana's Central Railway Station and with most other main cities of Cuba. The main railway station, also known as "General Senén Casas", is an important hub of the national railways. Located in the city centre, near the harbour, it was completely rebuilt in 1997.

The city of Santiago is also crossed by the Carretera Central highway and by the southern section of the A1 motorway, largely unbuilt, that will link it with Havana when it is completed.

Schools 
The main tertiary education institution is the University of Santiago de Cuba (Universidad de Oriente – Santiago de Cuba, UO).

Natives and residents 
Yordenis Ugas – boxer
Desi Arnaz – television/film actor, producer and bandleader
Emilio Bacardí – industrialist and philanthropist
Eusebia Cosme – declamdora negra, actress
Orestes Destrade – professional baseball player
Emilio Estefan – music producer and husband of singer Gloria Estefan
Silvina Fabars – National Dance Award recipient of 2014 and principal dancer of the Conjunto Folclórico Nacional
Ibrahim Ferrer – musician
Sindo Garay – musician
José María Heredia y Heredia – poet
Pancho Herrera- professional baseball player
Alberto Juantorena – Olympic gold medallist, 1976 Olympics
Faizon Love – television/film actor, comedian
Konnan – professional wrestler
Olga Guillot – singer
Paul Lafargue – journalist, literary critic, political writer and activist
La Lupe – salsa singer
Antonio Maceo Grajales – independence hero
Rita Marley – singer and wife of reggae singer Bob Marley
José Martí – independence hero; interred in Santiago de Cuba
Miguel Matamoros – musician
Eliades Ochoa – musician
Frank Pais – revolutionary and urban organizer for the 26th of July Movement
Richard Pérez-Peña – New York Times reporter
Carmen Quidiello – poet, playwright, First Lady of the Dominican Republic (1963)
Jorge Reyes – author
Jorge Mas Canosa
Marco Rizo – pianist, composer and arranger
Mariblanca Sabas Alomá – feminist and journalist
Esteban Salas y Castro – Baroque composer
Ñico Saquito (Benito Antonio Fernández Ortiz) – musician and trova composer
Compay Segundo – musician
Sasha Borrego  -Journalist

International relations

Twin towns – Sister cities 
Santiago de Cuba is twinned with:
 Diadema, São Paulo, Brazil
 Naples, Italy
 Oakland, California, United States
 Rosario, Argentina

See also 

1766 Cuba earthquake
Battle of Santiago de Cuba, 1898
Carnaval of Santiago de Cuba
Communidad Hebrea Hatikva
List of cities in Cuba
List of places in Cuba
Oriente Province
Santa Ifigenia Cemetery – burial place for many important figures of Santiago de Cuba

References

Bibliography

External links 

Municipality webpage 
Map of Santiago Bay from 1639 

 
Cities in Cuba
Populated places in Santiago de Cuba Province
Port cities in Cuba
Populated places established in 1515
1515 establishments in the Spanish West Indies
1510s establishments in Cuba
World Heritage Sites in Cuba